= Qahir =

- Location in Yemen
- Coordinates: 16°04′N 49°06′E
- Country: Yemen
- Governorate: Hadhramaut
- Time zone: UTC+3 (Yemen Standard Time)

Qahir is a village in eastern Yemen. It is located in the Hadhramaut Governorate.
